United States Industrial Alcohol Company was an alcohol distiller in the United States. Charles Edward Adams, was chairman of the board. In 1919 they were held responsible for the Boston Molasses Disaster, through their subsidiary, the Purity Distilling Company. 125 lawsuits were filed against the company in the aftermath.

References

Chemical companies of the United States